The Fixtape Vol.4: Under the Influence is a solo mixtape/album by Bone Thugs-n-Harmony member, Krayzie Bone and the fourth in the Fixtape series.

Track listing

References

2011 mixtape albums
Krayzie Bone albums
Albums produced by Lil' C (record producer)
Sequel albums